Jamesianthus is a genus of North American flowering plants in the family Asteraceae.

The genus is named for US botanist Robert Leslie James (1897–1977).

Species
There is only one known species, Jamesianthus alabamensis, called the Alabama warbonnet. It is native to the US states of Alabama and Georgia.

References

Monotypic Asteraceae genera
Tageteae
Flora of the Southeastern United States